1 Regiment RLC is a regiment of the British Army's Royal Logistic Corps.

History
The regiment was formed in 1812 and has participated in many conflicts such the Second World War and operations in Northern Ireland, Iraq and Afghanistan. After being known as 1 Divisional Column for many years, it became 1 Armoured Division Transport Regiment RCT in December 1977, 1 General Support Regiment RLC in April 1993 and 1 Regiment RLC in 2014. It moved from Gütersloh in Germany to St David's Barracks at MoD Bicester in 2016.

Organisation

The regiment currently has several units within it:
74 Headquarters Squadron
2 Close Support Squadron
12 Close Support Squadron
23 General Support Squadron
Regimental Light Aid Detachment, Royal Electrical and Mechanical Engineers.

It is partnered with 157 (Welsh) Regiment RLC in the UK.

References

External links

Regiments of the Royal Logistic Corps